The Secret Saturdays is an American animated television series created by Canadian cartoonist Jay Stephens for Cartoon Network. It debuted on October 3, 2008 in the United States. The series follows the adventures of the Saturdays, a family of cryptozoologists that work to keep the truth about cryptids from getting out, to protect both the human race and the creatures themselves. The Saturdays travel the Earth searching for cryptids to study and battling twisted villains like the megalomaniac V.V. Argost. The series is influenced by 1960's-era Hanna-Barbera action series and is combined with Jay Stephens' own personal interest in cryptozoology. The show finished its run on January 30, 2010, but aired reruns on Boomerang from December 5, 2011 to June 1, 2014.

The Secret Saturdays was the first Cartoon Network original series to be broadcast in high-definition.

The Saturday family later appear in the Ben 10: Omniverse episode TGIS where they team up with Ben Tennyson and Rook Blonko to stop Ben's enemy Dr. Animo who has revived the Saturdays' archenemy V.V. Argost in a plot to collaborate with him to cause Cryptid-based havoc.

Plot
The Secret Saturdays revolves around the titular Saturdays, a family of cryptozoologists consisting of parents Doc and Drew Saturday and their 11-year-old son, Zak Saturday. The Saturdays are members of the Secret Scientists, a global organization with the goal of studying and safeguarding sciences considered too dangerous to be general public knowledge. As the foremost experts in cryptids, the Saturdays are responsible for studying and protecting cryptids around the world, while also keeping their existence a secret from the rest of humanity and averting cryptid-related threats. The Saturdays travel in their airship with their cryptid companions Fiskerton, Komodo, and Zon, while the young Zak Saturday strives to help his parents with their missions and to master his mysterious innate ability to influence and control the actions of cryptids.

At the beginning of the series, the Secret Scientists are attacked en masse by V.V. Argost, the masked host of the cryptid-centric television series V.V. Argost's Weird World and a longtime enemy of the Secret Scientists. Argost and his henchmen steal the pieces of the Kur Stone, a Sumerian artifact which can lead its wielder to the location of Kur, an allegedly all-powerful cryptid. In the first season of the show, the Saturdays are also pitted against bounty hunter Leonidas Van Rook and his apprentice, who is later revealed to be Drew's long-lost brother Doyle Blackwell, who was separated from her after their parents died in an accident in the Himalayas. The Saturdays also discover an ancient mirror which leads to a dimension made of antimatter, and encounter their evil counterparts, whom Zak dubs the "Mondays." At the end of the first season, the Saturdays and Argost race to Kur's supposed resting place in Antarctica, only to discover that Kur is actually Zak; when the Kur stone first shattered years ago, Kur's soul entered Zak's unborn body, which is the origin of Zak's cryptid-influencing powers.

In the second season, Argost, taking an interest in Zak as the true Kur, bargains with Zak to teach him how to use his powers. Meanwhile, the Secret Scientists have turned against the Saturdays, wishing to capture Zak and place him into cryogenic sleep to prevent him from becoming a serious threat. As Doyle and a reformed Van Rook investigate the origins of V.V. Argost, they discover that Argost is actually a cryptid, the yeti, and was responsible for the murder of Drew and Doyle's parents decades ago. Argost captures Zak and reveals himself as the yeti, then uses the mirror artifact to summon Zak Monday, whose powers he steals, giving him the same powers as Zak. Argost and Zak wage a global cryptid war against each other using their Kur abilities, but Zak ultimately overpowers Argost, forcing him to retreat. After killing Van Rook, Argost captures Zak and tries to absorb his powers in addition to Zak Monday's, but the combination of matter and antimatter destroys Argost and the power of Kur permanently.

Episodes

Characters

 Zak Saturday (voiced by Sam Lerner)
 Doc Saturday (voiced by Phil Morris)
 Drew Saturday (voiced by Nicole Sullivan)
 Fiskerton (vocal effects provided by Diedrich Bader)
 Komodo (vocal effects provided by Fred Tatasciore)
 Zon (vocal effects provided by Fred Tatasciore)

Development and production
When Stephens first pitched the show, it was called Cryptids, after the undiscovered scientific monsters. It involved a team of globe-trotting cryptozoologists that were uniquely qualified for the job because they were once cryptids themselves. Okapi, Komodo, and Megamouth, along with their 9-year-old human mascot, Francis, served as a sort of anti-detective team. They scooted across land, sea, and air in what Stephens called a Campercopter and their goal was to preserve the mystery of the Earth's strangest creatures before they were exposed by humans or destroyed by the cryptids' nemesis, Monsieur Dodo. This version got him nowhere with many networks, though they all did show interest for some time.

Months later, the show was picked up by Cartoon Network, due to the network wanting more action shows at the time due to the success of Ben 10 and Ben 10: Alien Force. 9-year-old Francis became 11-year-old Zak Saturday and many of the original characters were deleted. For a time, the network wanted the show's name to be The Secret Adventures Of Zak Saturday, but it was later changed. Unlike most mystery shows, the goal of the heroes of The Secret Saturdays is not to reveal the existence of cryptids, but to hide it. The art style of the show was influenced by the artwork of Alex Toth and 1960s Hanna-Barbera action cartoons, such as Jonny Quest and The Herculoids. Michael Tavera created the music score for the show after finishing his work on Time Squad, ¡Mucha Lucha!, Lilo & Stitch: The Series, and Yin Yang Yo!.

In July 2008, Cartoon Network started a viral campaign for the show. Several commercials for a website called CryptidsAreReal.com aired on Cartoon Network. Each commercial featured a pet of the Saturday family: one showed Komodo, another Fiskerton, and a final one showed Zon. One area of the program's website also held a "secret" document: while most of the words on it were blackedout, the names of Drew and Doc (two of the main characters) were revealed. The document also talked about a creature discovered outside of Nottinghamshire, England. Though the first word was blacked-out, the paper said a "phantom" had been the newly discovered creature. It was implied that the creature was the Fiskerton Phantom, a cryptid reported to have lived outside of Nottinghamshire and commonly done by this website, would be Fiskerton, a main character in the show. To back this conclusion up, Zak stated in one episode that Fiskerton was lucky because Doc and Drew saved him, which was also stated in the document. Typed at the bottom of the document was the name "Agent Epsilon", a character in the show. The website also showed a blueprint of the Saturdays family's airship. Another site was linked to CryptidsAreReal.com: the page for an organization called Ten Hero Tusk (an anagram of "the Kur stone"), which states that its explorers are "D. Blackwell, B. Finster, and L. Van Rook", all of which are characters in the show. During San Diego Comic-Con 2008, booklets about a show called Weirdworld (the show-within-a-show) were given out, with the website for it on the back of them. Unlike CryptidsAreReal.com, this one could not be traced back to Cartoon Network. Later, commercials for Weirdworld aired on Cartoon Network for a few weeks before a commercial for The Secret Saturdays itself was aired on October 3, 2008.

Merchandise
A DVD featuring the first five episodes of the series (along with bonus features such as animatics) was released on July 21, 2009.  A second DVD with similar features was released on October 27, 2009. An encyclopedia entitled The Secret Saturdays: The Official Cryptid Field Guide was released on August 11, 2009. Graphic novels and chapter books were released by Del Ray Manga in Summer 2009. A video game called The Secret Saturdays: Beasts of the 5th Sun was released by D3 Publisher for the PlayStation 2, PlayStation Portable, Nintendo DS and Wii on October 20, 2009. Comic adventures of The Secret Saturdays appeared semi-monthly in 2010 as part of Cartoon Network Action Pack comic books published by DC Comics. A line of action figures and playsets was released by Mattel. One of the toys made by Mattel, the Secret Saturdays Fire Sword, received some controversy for the loudness of the toy, which could reach up to 121 dBs.

In other media
 The Saturday family later appear in the Ben 10: Omniverse episode "TGIS" where they team up with Ben Tennyson and Rook Blonko to stop Ben's enemy Dr. Animo who has revived the Saturdays' archenemy V.V. Argost in a plot to collaborate with him to cause Cryptid-based havoc.
 Zak makes an brief appearance in the OK K.O.! Let's Be Heroes final series "Thank You for Watching the Show".

References

External links
 Cryptids Are Real!, viral marketing website
 Weirdworld Show, website for the show within a show: Weirdworld
 
 

 
2000s American animated television series
2010s American animated television series
2000s American black cartoons
2010s American black cartoons
2008 American television series debuts
2010 American television series endings

American children's animated action television series
American children's animated adventure television series
American children's animated superhero television series
American children's animated science fantasy television series
American children's animated horror television series
Animated television series about children
Animated television series about families
Anime-influenced Western animated television series
 
Cartoon Network original programming
Cryptozoological television series
English-language television shows
Pterosaurs in fiction